Line 3 is a line of Metrovalencia, the railway service in Valencia, Spain. It opened in 1995, and connects Rafelbunyol and the airport.

References

Metrovalencia
Railway lines opened in 1995
Rapid transit lines in Spain